Dawn of Magic is an action role-playing computer game developed by Russian studio SkyFallen Entertainment and was originally released under the name of Blood Magic by 1C Company on December 16, 2005. The game was released under its western title by Deep Silver in April, 2007 in Europe, and Atari in North America on October 16, 2007.

A sequel titled Dawn of Magic 2 was released by Kalypso Media in the summer of 2009.

Story
Dawn of Magic is set in a fantasy world. In the Absolute, the setting's afterlife, a being called Modo endangered his companions in pursuit of power. The inhabitants of the Absolute called a tribunal and sentenced Modo to be reborn on earth, live a mortal life (retaining his memories but none of his power) and die after 100 years.

The game begins 40 years after Modo was sentenced. He has gained knowledge of mortal magic and seeks to enlist the player character's aid in his plan to destroy the earth, escape his prison and live forever in the Absolute.

Gameplay
Dawn of Magic features a 3D third person perspective game engine. The game world consists of area maps interlinked by portals. The player can choose from four starting characters, the Awkward Scholar, the Baker's Wife, the Weird Gypsy, and the Fat Friar. As the player character gains experience and levels, he or she improves basic attributes, skills in areas such as mêlée combat, trading, and crafting, and prowess in the game's twelve schools of magic. Each school of magic consists of eight spells; as the player gains prowess in a school of magic, his or her body morphs to take on characteristics reminiscent of the school.

Release history
1C Company released the single-player action role-playing game Blood Magic in Russia on December 16, 2005. A stand-alone expansion pack, Blood Magic: Time of Shadows, followed on November 24, 2006. The expansion featured a new story, upgraded interface, and multiplayer support via LAN or internet. On April 27, 2007, Deep Silver released English, French, German and Italian localizations of Blood Magic for the European market. The Deep Silver release was renamed Dawn of Magic and featured upgraded gameplay including multiplayer support.

The Blood Magic game engine was licensed to KranX Productions for the action role-playing game A Farewell to Dragons.

Reception
Blood Magic won the Best Debut award at the Russian game developers conference KRI 2006. Dawn of Magic has a ranking of 52 on the review aggregators Metacritic and GameRankings. GameSpot gave the game a score of 3 out of 10, criticizing its derivativeness, limited choices and numerous bugs. Martin Korda of IGN gave it 6.9 out of 10 and said that "despite its bold proclamations of reinventing the tried and tested Diablo template, Dawn of Magic remains an RPG with more than a whiff of the past hanging around it." while Emily Balistrieri of the same site gave it 5.4 and criticized its multiplayer, which according to her, lacked variety.

References

External links
Dawn of Magic (official Deep Silver website)
Blood Magic (official website)
Dawn of Magic (official Atari website)

2005 video games
2007 video games
1C Company games
Role-playing video games
Action role-playing video games
Fantasy video games
Video games developed in Russia
Windows-only games
Windows games
Deep Silver games
Multiplayer and single-player video games